Woolwich, also known as Woolwich St Mary, was an ancient parish containing the town of Woolwich on the south bank of the Thames and North Woolwich on the north bank. The parish was governed by its vestry from the 16th century to 1852, based in the Church of St Mary until 1842, after which in the purpose-built Woolwich Town Hall. The parish adopted the Public Health Act 1848 and was governed by the Woolwich Local Board of Health from 1852. When the parish became part of the district of the Metropolitan Board of Works in 1855 the local board was treated as if it were an incorporated vestry. It was in the county of Kent until it was transferred to London in 1889. In 1900 it was amalgamated with other parishes to form the Metropolitan Borough of Woolwich and had only nominal existence until it was abolished as a civil parish in 1930. Since 1965 it has been split between the Royal Borough of Greenwich and the London Borough of Newham.

Geography
The main part of the parish was a roughly triangular area south of the River Thames, including the town of Woolwich. The boundary with Plumstead to the east was very close to the centre of the town, located approximately where the Woolwich Arsenal station is now. The parish narrowed further south, including Woolwich Common and reaching to Shooter's Hill Road. The western boundary at this point was with Charlton Common in the parish of Charlton. North of the Thames the parish included two nearby sections of land known as North Woolwich. The western part was divided from the eastern section by the parish of East Ham. The eastern section stretched to the River Roding and had a boundary with the parish of Barking. The former area of the parish is now part of the Royal Borough of Greenwich to the south of the River Thames and the London Borough of Newham to the north.

Governance
The Parliamentary Boundaries Act 1832, which transferred county exclaves to their local counties for election of members of parliament, explicitly treated the North Woolwich area as part of Kent. The Counties (Detached Parts) Act 1844, applied the 1832 designations for all civil purposes.

The parish became part of the Greenwich Poor Law Union in 1836 and then the Woolwich Poor Law Union from 1868.

Woolwich was added to the Registrar General definition of the London Metropolis in 1837, appearing in the weekly tables of mortality from 1840. The parish was added to the Metropolitan Police District in 1840.

The vestry built a town hall, now known as the Old Town Hall in 1842.

The parish adopted the Public Health Act 1848 and a local board was formed in 1852, consisting of eighteen elected members and three nominated members.

In 1855 the parish was included in the district of the Metropolitan Board of Works. It was an anomaly amongst metropolitan parishes, having a local board of health, and this was treated as if it were an incorporated vestry.

Following the Local Government Act 1888, the parish was transferred from the County of Kent to the County of London in 1889.

Elsewhere in England, following the Local Government Act 1894, local boards of health became urban district councils. The Woolwich Local Board of Health continued to exist until 1900 when, as part of the provisions of the London Government Act 1899, the parish was combined with Eltham and Plumstead to form the Metropolitan Borough of Woolwich.

The parish continued to exist for election of a board of guardians, but was abolished for this purpose in 1930. The parishes in the Borough of Woolwich were then combined into a single parish.

Politics
From 1832 the more urbanised northern part of the parish was in the parliamentary borough of Greenwich with the southern part of the parish in the West Kent division. In 1885 the whole parish was included as part of the Woolwich constituency. In 1918 it was split, with the parish of Woolwich mostly becoming part of Woolwich West, with a small part in Woolwich East.

Population
The population at the decennial census was:

See also
 Old Woolwich
 Metropolitan Borough of Woolwich

References

Woolwich
Parishes governed by vestries (Metropolis)
Former civil parishes in the Royal Borough of Greenwich
History of the London Borough of Newham
1930 disestablishments in England